The 1992 FIS Ski Flying World Ski Championships took place on 21–22 March 1992 at Čerťák in Harrachov, Czechoslovakia for the second time. Harrachov previously hosted the event in 1983. It is the first Ski Flying World Championships in which Germany competed as a unified nation since their October 1990 reunification. Japan's Noriaki Kasai became the first non-European to both medal and win at the event.

Results

Medal table

References
 FIS Ski flying World Championships 1992 results. - accessed 28 November 2009.

FIS Ski Flying World Championships
FIS Ski Flying World Championships
FIS Ski Flying World Championships
Sport in Harrachov
Ski jumping competitions in Czechoslovakia
FIS Ski Flying World Championships